John Wittig (22 October 1921 – 23 October 1987) was a Danish film actor. He appeared in 30 films between 1950 and 1987. He was born and died in Denmark.

Selected filmography
 Som sendt fra himlen (1951)
 Adam and Eve (1953)
 Der kom en dag (1955)
 The Last Winter (1960)
 Relax Freddie (1966)
 Ballad of Carl-Henning (1969)
 Pelle the Conqueror (1987)

References

External links

1921 births
1987 deaths
Danish male film actors
People from Middelfart Municipality
20th-century Danish male actors